Qarah Kul (also romanized as Qarah Kūl, Qareh Kowl, and Qareh Kūl; also known as Karakol, Qarakol, and Qareh Kol) is a village in Qanibeyglu Rural District, Zanjanrud District, Zanjan County, Zanjan Province, Iran. At the 2006 census, its population was 423, in 104 families.

References 

Populated places in Zanjan County